The 2018 Wisconsin Attorney General election took place on November 6, 2018, to elect the attorney general of Wisconsin.

Republican incumbent Brad Schimel, first elected in 2014, ran for re-election to a second term.  Voting rights attorney and former federal prosecutor Josh Kaul, the Democratic nominee, defeated Schimel in the general election. Terry Larson, the Constitution Party nominee, also garnered around 2% of the vote, greater than the vote difference between Schimel and Kaul.

Republican primary 
Incumbent Attorney General Brad Schimel ran unopposed in the Republican primary.

Democratic primary 
Attorney Josh Kaul won the Democratic nomination unopposed.

Constitution primary 
Terry Larson won the Constitution Party nomination unopposed.

General election

Polling

Results 
Kaul won the election by a 0.65% margin.

See also 

 2018 United States attorney general elections
 2018 Wisconsin elections

References 

Wisconsin
Attorney General
Wisconsin Attorney General elections